The men's decathlon event at the 1966 British Empire and Commonwealth Games was held on 5 and 6 August at the Independence Park in Kingston, Jamaica. It was the first time that combined events were held at the Games.

Results

References

Athletics at the 1966 British Empire and Commonwealth Games
1966